Plain Township, Ohio may refer to:
Plain Township, Franklin County, Ohio
Plain Township, Stark County, Ohio
Plain Township, Wayne County, Ohio
Plain Township, Wood County, Ohio

See also
Plain Township (disambiguation)

Ohio township disambiguation pages